The Ragamuffin is a breed of domestic cat. It was once considered to be a variant of the Ragdoll cat but was established as a separate breed in 1994. Ragamuffins are notable for their friendly personalities and thick fur.

General description 

The physical traits of the breed include a rectangular, broad-chested body with shoulders supporting a short neck. These cats are classified as having heavy bones and a "substantial" body type. 

The head is a broad, modified wedge with a moderately rounded forehead with short or medium-short muzzle and an obvious nose dip. The muzzle is wide with puffy whisker pads. The body should appear rectangular with a broad chest and broad shoulders and moderately heavy muscling in the hindquarters, with the hindquarters being equally broad as the shoulders. A tendency toward a fatty pad in the lower abdomen is expected. 

Fur length is to be slightly longer around the neck and outer edges of the face, resulting in the appearance of a ruff. Texture is to be, soft, dense and silky. Ragamuffin kittens are usually born white and develop a color pattern as they mature. Every color and pattern is allowable, with or without white. Their coats can be solid color, stripes, spots or patches of white, black, blue, red, cream, chocolate, lilac, cinnamon, seal brown or mixed colors. Their eyes can be any solid color, with some exhibiting heterochromia.

History 

The IRCA Cherubim Cats developed from 1971–1994 (23 years) were used as the foundation cats for the Ragamuffin breed and included the IRCA Miracle Ragdolls, Ragdolls, Honey Bears, and Maxamillion lines.

In contrast, their cousin the Ragdoll breed was founded with only the IRCA Ragdoll lines developed from 1971–1975 (4 years).

Currently, acceptable outcrossings are as follows: 
ACFA (Siberian),
CFA (Long Haired Selkirk Rex, Straight),
GCCF (British Longhair).

Ragdoll background 

In the 1960s, a regular, non-pedigreed, white, domestic long-haired cat named Josephine (of unknown Angora or Persian stock), who had produced several litters of typical kittens, eventually produced a litter of unusually docile kittens. When the subsequent litter produced more of the same, Ann Baker (an established cat breeder) purchased several kittens from the owner and set out to create what is now known as the Ragdoll. The sires were of unrecorded Birman or Burmese ancestry.

In 1975, after a group of IRCA Ragdoll breeders left, Baker decided to spurn traditional cat breeding associations. She trademarked the name "Ragdoll" and “Cherubim” and set up her own registry, International Ragdoll Cat Association (IRCA). Baker imposed stringent standards on anyone who wanted to breed or sell cats under that name. The IRCA Ragdolls were also not allowed to be registered in other breed associations.

Breed divergence 

In 1994, a group of IRCA breeders decided to leave and form their own group because of the increasing restrictions. Owing to Baker's trademark on the name Ragdoll and Cherubim, the group renamed its stock of IRCA Cherubim Cats Ragamuffins. While the originally proposed name was Liebling, the name Ragamuffin was put forth as an alternative by Curt Gehm, one of the group's founders, and it was chosen. 

In the spirit of improving the breed's genetic health, personality, and temperament, the group selectively allowed a limited amount of outcross to Domestic Longhair cats that appeared to already fit the Standard of Perfection established in ACFA. Later, once the Domestic Longhair Cat allowance expired, outcrosses allowed historically include Persians. The group also allowed some limited outcrossing to IRCA Ragdolls initially (ended in 2010 for ACFA-recognized Ragamuffins). Only cats with at least one Ragamuffin parent and an accepted outcross in ACFA/CFA/GCCF currently qualify to be called Authentic Ragamuffins. (Cat Fanciers' Association, American Cat Fanciers Association, Governing Counsel of the Cat Fancy.)

The first cat association to accept the breed at full show champion status was the United Feline Organization (UFO), and shortly that same year it was accepted into the American Cat Fanciers Association (ACFA). Finally, the Cat Fanciers' Association (CFA) accepted them into the Miscellaneous class in February 2003 and advanced them to Championship class in February 2011.

The most obvious difference between typical Ragamuffins and Ragdolls is the required point coloration in Ragdolls, where as the Ragamuffin is allowed any color and pattern. The Standard of Perfection describes the Ragamuffin as requiring a 'sweet' overall expression with large, rounded with pinch at the corner, walnut-shaped eyes versus the Ragdoll's thinner, slightly angled almond-shaped eyes. Adding to the sweet expression, Ragamuffins have rounded contours between the ears and a nose scoop versus the Ragdoll which calls for flat planes. Ragamuffins call for a flatter topline and Ragdolls call for a more angular topline with the raised hind quarter. Ragamuffin coats are to be plush in texture and the Ragdoll allows for both silky or plush coats.

Color forms
Ragamuffins come in all patterns and colors, although colorpoints are permitted to be registered and bred they are not allowed to be shown in CFA. Their eyes can be any solid color, with some exhibiting heterochromia.

References

External links

 Ragdolls (floppy cats) information
 RagaMuffin Associated Group The original breed club begun by those who founded the Ragamuffin breed
 The RagaMuffin Kitten Breeders Society A group of RagaMuffin breeders and Ragamuffin lovers dedicated to raising authentic Ragamuffins while adhering to a code of ethics with respect to best breeding practices.
 Breed profile at IAMS cat breed guide
CFA Ragamuffin Breed Profile
Catster Ragamuffin Article
 CFA club for exhibitors, breeders and fanciers

Cat breeds
Cat breeds originating in the United States